Paul "Pablo" Robertson (1944–1990) was an American professional basketball player and member of the Harlem Globetrotters. At college, Robertson played on the 1962–63 Loyola University Chicago squad that won the NCAA tournament, although Robertson was dropped in the middle of the season due to grades.

Early life 
Pablo Robertson grew up in Harlem, New York, and played basketball at DeWitt Clinton High School. Pete Axthelm described him as "a guard who could ignite playground crowds in a way that no bigger man could match."

College career 
Robertson matriculated to Loyola University Chicago in 1961.

On December 29, 1962 in a game between Loyola and Wyoming at the All-College Tournament in Oklahoma City, Loyola's starting point guard Jack Egan fouled out. When Robertson was put in to replace Egan, Loyola became the first major college team known to play five African-American players at the same time.

Along with teammate Billy Smith, Robertson did poorly in his classes during the first semester of his second year, and was ruled ineligible to continue playing on the basketball team. Egan recalls that he got four Fs and one D, and joked that "he put too much time into that one subject."

After college 
According to Loyola teammate Billy Smith, Robertson was drafted into the Army in the mid-1960s to serve in the Vietnam War. Smith said that serving in war greatly affected Robertson, and that he turned to alcohol and drugs when he returned.

After the war, Robertson joined the Harlem Globetrotters. As a Globetrotter, he was one of the animated characters on the 1970s CBS Saturday morning cartoon series. He was with the Globetrotters for seven years.

Robertson died on June 23, 1990 at the age of 46 in a Long Island hospital.

References

External links
 

1940s births
1990 deaths
American men's basketball players
Basketball players from New York City
DeWitt Clinton High School alumni
Harlem Globetrotters players
Loyola Ramblers men's basketball players
People from Harlem
Sportspeople from Manhattan